Météo-France heat alert is a warning system, part of the French vigilance meteorologic system of Météo-France, put in place in France following the 2003 European heat wave. The 2022 heat wave was the earliest in the year since records began and marked the fourth time that a red heat alert had been issued since the protocol was activated after the 2003 heat wave.

References 

Météo-France